Badja could refer to:

Badja Station, a pastoral lease in Western Australia
Big Badja Hill, a mountain in New South Wales
Big Badja River, a river in New South Wales